Erzbach may refer to:
 Erzbach (Enns), a river of Styria, Austria, tributary of the Enns
 Erzbach (Osterbach), a river of Hesse, Germany, tributary of the Osterbach
 Erzbach, a part of the community Reichelsheim (Odenwald), Hesse, Germany